Kieron John Durkan (1 December 1973 – 28 February 2018) was a professional footballer who played as a midfielder. Active between 1992 and 2004, Durkan made over 250 appearances in the Football League. Born in England, he represented the Republic of Ireland at youth international level.

Early and personal life
Durkan was born in Chester, Cheshire and raised in nearby Runcorn.

Club career
He played professionally for Wrexham, Stockport County, Macclesfield Town, York City, Rochdale and Swansea City. Durkan later played non-League football for Caernarfon Town, Runcorn FC Halton, Leek Town and Cefn Druids.

International career
He earned five caps for the Republic of Ireland national under-21 team.

Later life and death
After retiring Durkan worked as a Police Community Support Officer. He committed suicide on 28 February 2018 at the age of 44.

References

1973 births
2018 deaths
Sportspeople from Chester
Sportspeople from Runcorn
English footballers
Republic of Ireland association footballers
Republic of Ireland under-21 international footballers
Association football midfielders
Wrexham A.F.C. players
Stockport County F.C. players
Macclesfield Town F.C. players
York City F.C. players
Rochdale A.F.C. players
Swansea City A.F.C. players
Caernarfon Town F.C. players
Cefn Druids A.F.C. players
English Football League players
2018 suicides
Suicides by carbon monoxide poisoning
Suicides in England